Siddheshwar Prasad (19 January 1929 – 22 January 2023) was an Indian politician belonging to the Indian National Congress. He was elected to the Lok Sabha, lower house of the Parliament of India from the Nalanda Constituency of Bihar in 1962, 1967 and 1971. He was earlier a Professor in Nalanda College in Bihar. He was the Governor of Tripura from June 1995 to June 2000.

Prasad died in Patna, Bihar on 22 January 2023, three days after his 94th birthday.

References

External links
Official biographical sketch in Parliament of India website

1929 births
2023 deaths
Governors of Tripura
India MPs 1962–1967
India MPs 1967–1970
India MPs 1971–1977
Indian National Congress politicians
Lok Sabha members from Bihar
Academic staff of Patliputra University